Pensions in Denmark consist of both private and public programs, all managed by the Agency for the Modernisation of Public Administration under the Ministry of Finance. Denmark created a multipillar system, consisting of an unfunded social pension scheme, occupational pensions, and voluntary personal pension plans. Denmark's system is a close resemblance to that encouraged by the World Bank in 1994, emphasizing the international importance of establishing multifaceted pension systems based on public old-age benefit plans to cover the basic needs of the elderly. The Danish system employed a flat-rate benefit (social security benefit) funded by the government budget and available to all Danish residents. The employment-based contribution plans are negotiated between employers and employees at the individual firm or profession level, and cover individuals by labor market systems. These plans have emerged as a result of the centralized wage agreements and company policies guaranteeing minimum rates of interest. The last pillar of the Danish pension system is income derived from tax-subsidized personal pension plans, established with life insurance companies and banks. Personal pensions are inspired by tax considerations, desirable to people not covered by the occupational scheme.

Also included in the Danish pension system are statutory supplementary pensions. These cover a significant portion of the population, sometimes much more than just the workforce. Supplementary pensions are institutionally and by ways of funding similar to the occupational system.

Public pensions

Universal social pensions 
In Denmark, the public pension consists of two tiers. The first tier provides a universal income to people over the age of 67. This pension is paid to anyone that meets its qualifications, regardless of a retiree's contributions. As of 2019, the maximum amount a person could receive was DKK 75.924 (US$11.504). However, it is means-tested, so it can be adjusted for lower income individuals up to a maximum of DKK 159.000 (US$ 24.091). Normally, the pension is reduced by 30 percent of any income that exceeds DKK 329.600. To receive this pension, recipients must have had lived in Denmark for 40 years while they were between the ages between 15 and 65. If a resident has spent less the 40 years in Denmark, then he or she can still receive the pension, just at a proportionately reduced rate. Funding for this pension isn’t base on contributions, rather funds are secured from general tax revenue collected by the state.

The Social Disability Pension program is financed by general tax revenues dependent on social and medical factors and is historically known as a standard disability pension program. The SDP evaluates the medical and social criteria on three levels, the first granting eligibility to individuals younger than 60 with minimal work capacity. The next level is for people younger than 60 who have the work capacity equivalent to one third of normal, along with individuals between 60 and 66 years of age with hardly any ability to work. Lastly, the ordinary SDP level is granted to individuals with the work capacity below half of normal, based upon social and/or health criteria. All pensioners receive a minimum of 40 percent of their average earnings, and receive additional support through easily accessible universal healthcare and housing benefits.

Occupational pensions 
Occupational Pensions are another type of pension, covering nearly 90 percent of the Danish workforce. These schemes are mandated by collective bargaining agreements made between employers and employees, usually at the sectoral level. Company wide plans do exist, but they are not as common as sector wide pensions. Payouts made by these types of schemes are also determined by the contributions made by employees and employers. Typically, employee contributions range from 9 to 17 percent of their salary, with the average amount being 11 percent. Generally, high wage earners contribute a higher percentage of their income to their pension than low wager earners.

It is typical for the employer to contribute two thirds and the employee one third in the occupational pension system. Workers covered by different collective labor agreements are subject to mandatory participation, with varying contribution rates. Most plans depend on defined-contribution schemes, often including death and disability benefits. 
In 1998, the labor force was recorded to have contributed about 4% of their gross salary to pensions, and in 2002, 77% of the labor force contributed over 7%, exemplifying a steady growth in the average contribution rate. Depending on the plan, payouts can be collected in the form of phased withdrawals, lump sums, or life annuities.

Personal and supplementary pensions

Personal pensions 
Personal pensions cover additional private saving. Danish subsidized personal pension plans are extensive, often similar to occupational pension plans; however participation is voluntary and plans are financed by participants. Because contributions occur by means of collective labor agreements, they are classified as quasimandatory, as most workers are covered. These individual pension savings agreements between the individual and the institution stipulate the policy holder's entitlement to benefits after a specified age. Personal pensions are partial tax exemptions and have payouts similar to public pensions in that they can be collected by means of phased withdrawals, lump sums, or life annuities.

Labor Market Supplementary Pension Fund 
The largest of the supplementary pension schemes is the Labor Market Supplementary Pension Fund, Arbejdsmarkedets Tillaegspension, or ATP. This pension's payout is determined by the contributions made by the individual. The more years a person works, and the longer retirement is delayed, the more money a retiree will receive. Contributions to ATP are mandatory for employees aged 16 to 65 who work more than 9 hours a week. Employers are also required to make payments. The required contributions are set by a fixed sum. As of 2014, for a full-time employee, the required payment was DKK 3240 a year. An employer is responsible for two-thirds of the payment while the employee makes the other third. If a person is less than a full-time employee, the contribution is reduced accordingly.  Like the universal pension, the retirement age is 65. However, starting 2024, it will be increase by six months every year until it reaches 67.

Employees' Capital Pension Fund 
Employees’ Capital Pension Fund (in Danish, the Lønmodtagernes Dyrtidsfond or LD) was established in 1978 and was aimed at being an economic policy measure. When wages were adjusted upwards several times in the late 1970s, the Danish government decided only one price adjustment would be allowed annually, leaving the rest frozen and held in LD personal accounts until retirement. This attempt to contain inflationary practice led to the allowance of investing assets in mutual funds. In June 2005, the LD increased the total net asset under management in a month by investing all assets in mutual funds, a total of 12 percent.

Special Pension Savings 
Introduced in 1998 as a fiscal policy tool to slow consumer spending while increasing pension saving by requiring all wage earners to contribute one percent of their gross salary, the Special Pension Savings program (SP) is Denmark's second largest supplementary pension scheme behind the ATP. Until suspension in 2003, SP benefits depended on investment returns and the size of the contribution. Suspension can be examined as a result of reduced incentives to engage, as households are not always fully rational, finding value in the optimization of employer contributions instead.

Challenges 

Pension policy in Denmark during the 1980s and 1990s was defined by pension funds and insurance companies guaranteeing a minimum interest rate for new pension policies. Compared to the high nominal rates that were common at the time, the guaranteed rates were low and were given to policyholders free of charge.
Pension institutions invested in callable mortgage bonds that allowed borrowers to refinance their mortgages when interest rates fell, creating an asymmetric interest risk rate and encompassing a significant portion of the Danish financial system. When equity markets collapsed and the new millennium global interest rates diminished, pension contracts and institutions were subject to liabilities, drained capital reserves, and mismatched assets. This led to market-to-market valuation of the balance sheet and supervisory requirements to focus on the ability to withstand economic stress.

Pension systems in advanced capitalist economies are influenced significantly by labor market deregulation, unionization, deindustrialization, the rise of the service sector, and trends toward welfare state entrenchment. Denmark's deep integration in the world economy introduces risk as global financial conditions would impact household debt and consumption. Decommodification is influenced heavily by pensions because of the link created between retirement income and labor market attachment. Although the Nordic pension system combines generous social protections and labor market flexibility, polarization between workers and the unemployed widens inequality and in the case of occupational pensions, shifts risk to employees. To reduce labor supply of older workers while consequently lessening youth unemployment, early retirement would allow individuals who have paid contributions for up to thirty years go on early retirement at 60 until they qualify for old age pension at 65.

See also
 Pan-European Pension

References 

Den
Finance in Denmark